The Norfolk State Spartans men's basketball team represents Norfolk State University, located in Norfolk, Virginia, in NCAA Division I basketball competition. They currently compete in the Mid-Eastern Athletic Conference. The Spartans are currently coached by Robert Jones and play their home games at the Joseph G. Echols Memorial Hall (7,000). The Spartans men's basketball team is best known for defeating the #2 seeded Missouri in the 2012 NCAA Division I men's basketball tournament 86–84, the first tournament appearance for Norfolk State. It was only the fifth time that a 15th seed has defeated a 2nd seed. Norfolk State has qualified for the NCAA tournament at the Division I level three times, in 2012, 2021, and 2022.

Post-season

NCAA Division I tournament results
The Spartans have appeared in three NCAA Division I tournaments. Their combined record is 2–3.

NCAA Division II tournament results
The Spartans have appeared in the NCAA Division II tournament 15 times. Their combined record is 18–19.

NIT results
The Spartans have appeared in the National Invitation Tournament (NIT) twice. Their record is 1–2.

CIT results
The Spartans have appeared in four CollegeInsider.com Postseason Tournament (CIT). Their combined record is 0–4.

Retired numbers
Three Spartan players have had their numbers retired by Norfolk State University. Kyle O’Quinn is the latest, with his number 10 retired by the school on February 16, 2019.

Spartans in the NBA
Bob Dandridge
Ray Epps
David Pope
Kyle O'Quinn

References

External links